Calosoma auropunctatum,  is a species of ground beetle. This species was previously classified as Calosome maderae ssp. auropunctatum. This species is found from Europe (except in western and southwestern parts) eastward to Anatolia, Central Asia and western China and Mongolia.

References
Calosoma (Campalita) auropunctatum (Herbst, 1784)

External links

auropunctatum
Beetles of Asia
Beetles of Europe
Beetles described in 1874